I Accuse is a 2003 drama film directed by John Ketcham. It is based on the case of John Schneeberger, a Canadian doctor convicted of using drugs to rape two patients.

Characters
Estella Warren as Kimberly Jantzen
John Hannah as Richard Darian
John Kapelos as Detective Murray
Tom Butler as Warren Hart
Cavan Cunningham as Male Clerk
Aaron Pearl as Billy
Tim Henry as Officer Rod Kresgy
Lindi Lee as Nola

External links 
 
 
 http://crimemagazine.com/rapist-md-0 - background on the story (subscription required)

2003 films
2003 crime drama films
English-language Canadian films
Canadian crime drama films
Canadian crime thriller films
CineTel Films films
Films about rape
2000s English-language films
2000s Canadian films